Sylwester Janowski (born 8 December 1976) is a Polish former footballer who is last known to have played as a goalkeeper for Narew Ostrołęka.

Career

Janowski played for Poland at the 1993 UEFA European Under-16 Championship, which Poland won, and the 1993 FIFA U-17 World Championship.

He started his career with Siarka Tarnobrzeg in the Polish top flight.

In 2008, Janowski signed for Polish fourth division side Narew Ostrołęka after playing for a Polish community team in Spain.

References

External links
 

Polish footballers
Expatriate footballers in Spain
Living people
1976 births
Association football goalkeepers
Ekstraklasa players
Poland youth international footballers
Siarka Tarnobrzeg players
Polish expatriates in Spain
Tomasovia Tomaszów Lubelski players
Warmia Grajewo players
People from Tarnobrzeg